Muhaimin Izuddin bin Muhammad Asri (born 4 August 2002) is a Malaysian professional footballer who plays for Malaysia Super League club Kelantan as a midfielder.

Club career

Kelantan
Muhaimin started his career with Kelantan Youth team before joined FAM-MSN Project in 2021. On 7 January 2022, Muhaimin rejoined the club after one season represented FAM-MSN Project. On 16 April 2022, Muhaimin made his debut for the club in 3-1 win over Perak during Malaysia Premier League match.

Career statistics

Club

References

External links 

2002 births
Living people
People from Kelantan
Association football midfielders
Malaysian footballers
Malaysia Premier League players
Malaysia Super League players
Kelantan F.C. players